Aleksander Kakowski (5 February 1862 – 30 December 1938) was a Polish politician, diplomat, a member of the Regency Council and, as Cardinal and Archbishop of Warsaw, the last titular Primate of the Kingdom of Poland before Poland fully regained its independence in 1918.

Early life
He was born on 5 February 1862 in Dębiny near Przasnysz, the son of Franciszek Kakowski and Paulina Ossowska. He was ordained a priest on 30 May 1886 in Warsaw, by Cardinal Wincenty Chościak-Popiel. The following year he became one of the professors at the Warsaw Theological Seminary. In 1910 he became Rector of the Saint Petersburg Roman Catholic Theological Academy, and on 22 July 1913 he was ordained a bishop by Stanisław Zdzitowiecki. On 14 September 1913 he became the archbishop of Warsaw in St. John's Cathedral, thus becoming the titular primate of the Kingdom of Poland.

World War I and the Regency Council
After the outbreak of World War I, he remained in Warsaw and in 1917, he was appointed to be a member of the Regency Council, a semi-independent and temporary highest authority of the Kingdom of Poland, recreated by the Central Powers as part of their Mitteleuropa plan. Kakowski was one of three members of that body, which served as a provisional head of state (hence the word "regency" in its name).

Relations with Rome

On 28 November 1919, he was the main consecrator of Achille Ratti, the papal nuncio to Poland who later became Pope Pius XI. On 15 December, Kakowski himself was made a cardinal. During his service as the Archbishop of Warsaw, Kakowski promoted the creation of a strong Catholic press. He was one of the authors of the success of Rycerz Niepokalanej, one of the most popular newspapers in prewar Poland. He was also the main creator of the theological faculty at the Warsaw University and of the Catholic Action movement. For his role in liberating Poland from foreign occupation, he was awarded the Order of the White Eagle, the highest Polish decoration, in 1925; in July 1938, he even briefly appeared as the head of that order's chapter. In 1930, he also became a "bailiff of honour and devotion" of the Order of St John of Jerusalem. His successor, August Hlond, was to reintroduce the title of Primate of Poland after the Second World War, but Kakowski continued to style himself Primate of the Kingdom of Poland until his death, on 30 December 1938.

References

1862 births
1938 deaths
People from Przasnysz County
People from Płock Governorate
20th-century Polish cardinals
Archbishops of Warsaw
Members of the Regency Council (Poland)
Bailiffs Grand Cross of Honour and Devotion of the Sovereign Military Order of Malta
Polish anti-communists
Polish independence activists
Recipients of the Order of the White Eagle (Poland)